L29 may refer to:
 60S ribosomal protein L29
 Aero L-29 Delfín, a Czechoslovakian military trainer aircraft
 Cord L-29, an American automobile